The Tangata manu ("bird-man," from  "human beings" +  "bird") was the winner of a traditional competition on Rapa Nui (Easter Island). The ritual was an annual competition to collect the first sooty tern egg of the season from the islet of Motu Nui, swim back to Rapa Nui and climb the sea cliff of Rano Kau to the clifftop village of Orongo.

Myth
In the Rapa Nui mythology, the deity Make-make was the chief god of the birdman cult, and the other three deities associated with it were Hawa-tuu-take-take (the Chief of the eggs, a male god), his wife Vie Hoa, and another female deity named Vie Kenatea.  Each of these four also had a servant god who was associated with them.  The names of all eight would be chanted by contestants during the various rituals preceding the egg hunt.

Birdman religion
Contestants, all men of importance on the island, were revealed in dreams by ivi-attuas or prophets (who might be either men or women). Each contestant would then appoint one or sometimes two hopu (other adult men of lesser status) who would actually swim to Motu Nui carrying provisions in a bundle of reeds called a pora under one arm and await the arrival of the terns, hoping to return with the first egg, whilst their tribal sponsors, the contestants, waited at the stone village of Orongo. The race was very dangerous and many hopu were killed by sharks, by drowning, or by falling from cliff faces, though replacements were apparently easily available.

Once the first egg was collected, the finder would go to the highest point on Motu Nui and call out to the shore of the main island, announcing his benefactor by that benefactor's new name and telling him, "Go shave your head, you have got the egg!"  The cry would be taken up by listeners at the shoreline who would pass it up the cliff side to the contestants waiting in the stone village.  The unsuccessful hopu would then collectively swim back to the main island while the egg-finder would remain on Motu Nui and would fast alone until he swam back, which he would do with the egg secured inside a reed basket tied to his forehead. On his reaching land, he would then climb the steep, rocky cliff face and, if he did not fall, present the egg to his patron, who would have already shaved his head and painted it either white or red.  This successful contestant (not the hopu) would then be declared tangata-manu, would take the egg in his hand and lead a procession down the slope of Rano Kau to Anakena if he was from the western clans or Rano Raraku if he was from the eastern clans. The new tangata-manu was entitled to gifts of food and other tributes (including his clan having sole rights to collect that season's harvest of wild bird eggs and fledglings from Motu Nui), and went into seclusion for a year in a special ceremonial house.  Once in residence there he was considered tapu (sacred) for the next five months of his year-long status, and allowed his nails to grow and wore a headdress of human hair.  He would spend his time eating and sleeping, and would be expected to engage in no other activity.

The Birdman cult was suppressed by Christian missionaries in the 1860s. The origin of the cult and the time thereof are uncertain, as it is unknown whether the cult replaced the preceding Moai-based religion or had co-existed with it. Katherine Routledge was, however, able to collect the names of 86 tangata-manu.

In popular culture
The band Rasputina's song Oh Bring Back the Egg Unbroken on their 2007 album, Oh Perilous World, is about these traditions.
The Hollywood film Rapa Nui has a version of the race, though in the wrong historic context.

References

Rapa Nui mythology
Easter Island